Myosin VIIA is protein that in humans is encoded by the MYO7A gene. Myosin VIIA is a member of the unconventional myosin superfamily of proteins. Myosins are actin binding molecular motors that use the enzymatic conversion of ATP - ADP + inorganic phosphate (Pi) to provide the energy for movement.

Myosins are mechanochemical proteins characterized by the presence of a motor domain, an actin-binding domain, a neck domain that interacts with other proteins, and a tail domain that serves as an anchor. Myosin VIIA is an unconventional myosin with the longest tail (1360 aa). The tail is expected to dimerize, resulting in a two-headed molecule. Unconventional myosins have diverse functions in eukaryotic cells and are primarily thought to be involved in the movement or linkage of intra-cellular membranes and organelles to the actin cytoskeleton via interactions mediated by their highly divergent tail domains.

MYO7A is expressed in a number of mammalian tissues, including testis, kidney, lung, inner ear, retina and the ciliated epithelium of the nasal mucosa.

Clinical significance 
Mutations in the MYO7A gene cause the Usher syndrome type 1B, a combined deafness/blindness disorder. Affected individuals are typically profoundly deaf at birth and then undergo progressive retinal degeneration.

Model organisms

Model organisms have been used in the study of MYO7A function. A spontaneous mutant mouse line, called Myo7ash1-6J was generated. Male and female animals underwent a standardized phenotypic screen to determine the effects of deletion. Twenty three tests were carried out on mutant mice and ten significant abnormalities were observed. Male homozygous mutant mice displayed a decreased body weight, a decrease in body fat, improved glucose tolerance and abnormal pelvic girdle bone morphology. Homozygous mutant mice of both sex displayed various abnormalities in a modified SHIRPA test, including abnormal gait, tail dragging and an absence of pinna reflex, a decrease in grip strength, an increased thermal pain threshold, severe hearing impairment and a number of abnormal indirect calorimetry and clinical chemistry parameters.

References

External links 
  GeneReviews/NCBI/NIH/UW entry on Usher Syndrome Type I

Further reading 

 
 
 
 
 
 
 
 
 
 
 
 
 
 
 
 
 
 

Proteins
Motor proteins
Cytoskeleton
Human proteins
Genes mutated in mice